KGUM, (567 AM) is a radio station licensed to serve the community of Hagåtña, Guam.

Owned by Sorensen Media Group, it broadcasts a news/talk format branded as News Talk K57. Although KGUM broadcasts at 567 kHz, most U.S. radios tune in 10 kHz increments only; the station has thus marketed itself as being on the next nearest frequency, 570. Stations in Guam fall within the jurisdiction of the Geneva Frequency Plan of 1975, instead of the North American Regional Broadcasting Agreement used in the U.S. mainland.

KGUM's sister stations include FM stations KZGZ and KGUM-FM, TV stations KTGM and KEQI-LD, and additional stations in the Northern Mariana Islands.

History
KATB went on the air in February 1975. It was owned by Magof, Inc., a company of A. T. Bordallo. Bordallo died in 1977, and the station was transferred to his estate. K-57 Radio bought the station in 1981, relaunching it as K57 Radio with the new callsign of KGUM. Four years later, KGUM began using the name News Talk K57.

In 1992, KGUM began broadcasting with 10,000 watts.

A storm knocked down KGUM's tower in January 2016, requiring the station to broadcast under special temporary authority with 5,000 watts.

Programming
K57 carries CBS News Radio every hour around the clock and provides hourly local news updates from Sorensen's Pacific News Center (PNC) during local programming. PNC's nightly TV newscast is simulcast on K57.

K57's weekday daytime and Saturday morning hours are dedicated to locally produced talk shows, while nationally syndicated programs play overnight, Saturday afternoons and Sunday.

External links
K57 KGUM official website

FCC History Cards for KGUM

GUM
Radio stations established in 1975
News and talk radio stations in insular areas of the United States
1975 establishments in Guam
Hagåtña, Guam